The 1996–97 SK Rapid Wien season was the 99th season in club history.

Squad statistics

Fixtures and results

Bundesliga

League table

Cup

Austrian Supercup

Champions League

Qualification round

Group stage

References

1996-97 Rapid Wien Season
Austrian football clubs 1996–97 season